Hunted People is a 1926 German silent adventure film directed by Nunzio Malasomma and starring Carlo Aldini, Maly Delschaft, and Erich Kaiser-Titz.

The film's sets were designed by the art director Max Heilbronner.

Cast

References

Bibliography

External links

1926 films
Films of the Weimar Republic
Films directed by Nunzio Malasomma
German silent feature films
German black-and-white films
German adventure films
1926 adventure films
Silent adventure films
1920s German films